Governor Cross may refer to:

Burton M. Cross (1902–1998), 61st and 63rd Governor of Maine
Wilbur Lucius Cross (1862–1948), 71st Governor of Connecticut